To be learned is to have much learning.

Learned may also refer to:

 Learned (surname), an American surname
 Learned Hand (1872–1961), an American judge and judicial philosopher
 Learned, Mississippi, a town in the United States
 Learned Pond, a body of water in Framingham, Massachusetts, United States

See also
 List of people known as the Learned